The Scheibe SF-25 Falke is a German touring motor glider developed from the earlier Bergfalke glider by Scheibe Flugzeugbau. Since May 2006 the business has been run by Scheibe Aircraft GmbH.

Development
The company had produced the Motor Spatz but decided to produce a better light aircraft based on the Bergfalke glider. It had a new forward fuselage with an enclosed cockpit with two side-by-side seats and originally a Hirth F10A2a engine in the nose. It first flew in May 1963 as the SF-25A Motor Falke. After an initial batch of aircraft the wing was lowered and it was renamed as just the SF-25B Falke. A number of variants were built with various engines and the type was licence built by Sportavia-Putzer, Aeronautica Umbra (Italy), Loravia (France) and Slingsby (United Kingdom). The current model is the SF 25C. It is currently available with a choice of three engines: the Rotax 912 80 hp, the Rotax 912S (100 hp) and the Rotax 914F3 (115 hp).

Variants

SF-25A Motor Falke
First production batch with a Hirth F10A2a engine, 56 built.
SF-25B Falke
Improved variant with lower wing position and a 45hp Stark Stamo engine, 372 built.
SF-25C Falke
Same as a SF-25B but with an alternator and electric starter.  Sub-variants include:
Falke 1700
49 kW (65 hp) Limbach 1700 EA 1 IA, driving propeller at 3,450 rpm;
Falke 2000
60 kW (80 hp) Limbach 2000 EA, driving propeller at 3,450 rpm (about 512 Limbach powered Falkes built by 1998);
Rotax Falke 
(a) 60 kW (80 hp) Rotax 912 A running at 5,800 rpm and geared down to 2,500 rpm propeller speed; tricycle gear an option (about 130 Rotax powered Falkes built by 1998), or
(b) 75 kW (100 hp) Rotax 912S at 5,800 rpm and geared down to 2,500 rpm propeller speed, or
(c) 85 kW (115 hp) Rotax 914F3 at 5,800 rpm and geared down to 2,500 rpm propeller speed with 5 minute time limit; 75 kW (100 hp) continuous.
Falke 100PS
Glider tug.
SF-25CS Falke
A SF-25C with a feathering propeller; feathering was an option with the Falke 1700, 2000, and Rotax Falke.
SF-25D Falke
SF-25B converted with a Limbach 1700A engine.
SF-25E Super Falke
A SF-25CS with extended wing, a narrow-chord vertical tail. air brakes and a raised bubble canopy, first flown in 1974.
SF-25K K-Falke
A SF-25C with folding wings and large canopy.
Slinsgby T61 Falke/Slingsby Venture
Licence built variant of the SF-25B, 76 built

Operators

Royal Air Force of Oman

Specifications (Rotax Falke)

Byron Bay gliding club (Australia) have re-engined using a Jabiru 2200.
"We get a sound 500 ft/min climb rate measured with a logger and this aircraft will take an honest 190kg pay load with 1 hour of fuel"

Notes

References

 
 

 FLIGHT MANUAL SF25B 
 FLIGHT MANUAL SF25C 

1960s German civil utility aircraft
Falke
Motor gliders
High-wing aircraft
Low-wing aircraft
Single-engined tractor aircraft
Aircraft first flown in 1963